Shalwar kameez  (also salwar kameez and less commonly shalwar qameez) is a traditional combination dress worn by women, and in some regions by men, in South Asia, and Central Asia.

Shalwars are trousers which are atypically wide at the waist but which narrow to a cuffed bottom. They are held up by a drawstring or elastic belt, which causes them to become pleated around the waist. The trousers can be wide and baggy, or they can be cut quite narrow, on the bias. Shalwars have been traditionally worn in a wide region which includes Eastern Europe, West Asia, Central Asia, and South Asia. The kameez is a long shirt or tunic.   The side seams are left open below the waist-line (the opening known as the chaak), which gives the wearer greater freedom of movement. The kameez is usually cut straight and flat; older kameez use traditional cuts; modern kameez are more likely to have European-inspired set-in sleeves. The kameez may have a European-style collar, a Mandarin collar, or it may be collarless; in the latter case, its design as a women's garment is similar to a kurta. The combination garment is sometimes called salwar kurta, salwar suit, or Punjabi suit.

The shalwar and kameez were introduced into South Asia by arriving Muslims in the north in the 13th century: at first worn by Muslim women, their use gradually spread, making them a regional style, especially in the historical Punjab region. The shalwar-kameez is a widely-worn, and national dress, of Pakistan. It is also widely worn by men in Afghanistan, by women and some men in the Punjab region of India, from which it has been adopted by women throughout India, and more generally South Asia.

When women wear the shalwar-kameez in some regions, they usually wear a long scarf or shawl called a dupatta around the head or neck. In South Asia, the dupatta is also employed as a form of modesty—although it is made of delicate material, it obscures the upper body's contours by passing over the shoulders. For Muslim women, the dupatta is a less stringent alternative to the chador or burqa (see hijab and purdah); for Sikh and Hindu women, the dupatta is useful when the head must be covered, as in a temple or the presence of elders. 
Everywhere in South Asia, modern versions of the attire have evolved; the shalwars are worn lower down on the waist, the kameez have shorter length, with higher splits, lower necklines and backlines, and with cropped sleeves or without sleeves.

Etymology and history

The English word "shalwar" derives ultimately from the Persian language.  According to the "Oxford English Dictionary": its etymology is: " < Urdu šalwār, Hindi salvār, < Persian šalwār." According to the Oxford Dictionary of English, it is Originally From Persian šalwār." According to the Random House Unabridged Dictionary: "1880–85; < Hindi < Persian shalwār".  According to Steingass's A Comprehensive Persian-English Dictionary, " شلوار shalwār, shulwār, Inner breeches, drawers reaching to the feet (the outer breeches being called tuṃbān); sailorsʼ or travellersʼ trousers.  شلوار بند shalwār-band, Fastening of breeches."   According to Shakespear's A dictionary of Hindustani and English,"  شلوار shalwār Persian (or shilwār) s. m. Trousers."  According to McGregor's Oxford Hindi English Dictionary, "शलवार śalwār (Persian: śalwār) Loose cotton trousers worn by women."

The English word "kameez," derives from the Arabic language.  According to the Oxford Dictionary of English, "Kameez: A long tunic worn by many people from South Asia, typically with a salwar or churidars. Origin: From Arabic qamīṣ, perhaps from late Latin camisia (see chemise)" According to Wehr's A Dictionary of Modern Written Arabic:  " قميص  qamīs: shirt, dress, gown, covering, cover, case, wrap, envelope, jacket;  plural: قمص   qamus"  According to Steingass's A Comprehensive Persian-English Dictionary, "Arabic قميص qamīṣ, A shirt, shift, or any kind of inner garment of linen; also a tunic, a surplice (of cotton, but not of wool); the membrane which surrounds the fœtus in the womb, amnion; pericardium; a galloping horse that shakes its rider."  According to Platt's A Dictionary of Urdu, Classical Hindi, and English, "Arabic قميص qamīṣ, vulg. qamīz, kamīj, s.m. A shirt; a shift; a chemise (cf. It. camicia; Port. camisa). According to McGregor's Oxford Hindi-English Dictionary: "क़मीज़ qamīz (Arabic: qamīş) a shirt".

The English word combination "shalwar kameez," is an internationalism derived from the Urdu language; according to Patrizia Anesa, author of Lexical Innovation in World Englishes: Cross-fertilization and Evolving Paradigms, "Salwar-kameez. ... may also be described as an internationalism given its origin (Urdu). This word-formation process is based on the combination of two elements which are two garments (baggy pants and a tunic or shirt) and constitute an outfit typical of South and Central Asia."  Author Garland Cannon in "Problems in Studying Loans," in Proceedings of the 25th Annual Meeting of the Berkeley Linguistics Society, says,  "... the old Urdu shalwar-kameez 'women's loose-fitting trousers and long tunic' was first used in English by colonial residents on the Indian subcontinent. (page 332)"

Description
The shalwar are loose pajama-like trousers. The legs are wide at the top, and narrow at the ankle.  The kameez is a long shirt or tunic, often seen with a Western-style collar; however, for female apparel, the term is now loosely applied to collarless or mandarin-collared kurtas. The kameez might be worn with pajamas as well, either for fashion or comfort. Some kameez styles have side seams (known as the chaak), left open below the waist-line, giving the wearer greater freedom of movement.

Styles
The kameez can be sewn straight and flat, in an "A" shape design or flowing like a dress; there are a variety of styles. Modern kameez styles are more likely to have European-inspired set-in sleeves. If the tailor's taste or skill is displayed, this will be seen in the shape of the neckline and the decoration of the kameez. The kameez may be cut with a deep neckline, sewn in diaphanous fabrics, or styled in cap-sleeve or sleeveless designs.

There are many styles of shalwar: the Peshawari shalwar, Balochi shalwar, Sindhi choreno and Punjabi shalwar.

Although various regions of the Indian subcontinent now wear the outfit in its various forms, the outfit was originally only popular on a wide scale in Afghanistan, Khyber Pakhtunkhwa, Balochistan and the Punjab region of Indian subcontinent. However, the shalwar kameez has now become popular across the Indian subcontinent.

Different forms
The following are some of the styles of shalwar kameez.

Anarkali suit

The shalwar kameez known as the Anarkali suit is named after the court dancer from Lahore. This suit has a timeless style which has become very popular. It is made up of a long, frock-style top and features a slim fitted bottom. This style of suit links the Indian subcontinent with the women's firaq partug (frock and shalwar) of northwestern Pakistan and Afghanistan and to the traditional women's clothing of parts of Central Asia. It also links to the Punjab region, where the Anarkali suit is similar to the anga and the Peshwaz worn in Jammu.

Afghanistan suits
The styles of shalwar kameez worn in Afghanistan include various styles of khet partug, perahan tunban and Firaq partug worn by Pashtuns, Tajiks, and Hazaras. The shalwar tends to be loose and rests above the ankles.

Peshawari shalwar suit

The traditional dress of Peshawar and other parts of Khyber Pakhtunkhwa, Pakistan, is the khalqa (gown) which opens at the front, or shirt which does not open at the front, and the Peshawari shalwar which is very loose down to the ankles. The Peshawari shalwar can be used with a number of upper garments and is part of the clothing of Khyber Pakhtunkhwa.

Balochi suits
The clothing of Balochistan, Pakistan includes the shalwar kameez which when worn by males consists of a very baggy shalwar using large lengths of cloth. The kameez is also loose,  and traditionally is long, with long sleeves. The present Balochi shalwar kameez replaced the earlier version which consisted of a robe to the ankles and a shalwar using cloth of up to 40 yards. The Pashtuns in northern Balochistan wear clothes similar to the styles worn in Afghanistan.

The female Balochi suit consists of the head scarf, long dress and a shalwar.

Phiran, poots and shalwar
In Kashmir, the outfit consists of the phiran, poots and shalwar.

Punjabi suits
The traditional shalwar kameez worn in the Punjab region is cut differently to the styles worn in Balochistan and Afghanistan and is known as a "Punjabi suit" with the kameez being cut straight and flat with side slits (which is a local development as earlier forms of kameez did not have side slits).  The shalwar is wide at the top but fits closely to the legs and is gathered at the ankles. The Punjabi shalwar is also cut straight and gathered at the ankles with a loose band reinforced with coarse material. In rural Punjab, the shalwar is still called the suthan, which is a different garment that was popular in previous centuries, alongside the churidar and kameez combination (which is still popular). In Britain, British Asian women from the Punjab region of the Indian subcontinent have brought the dress to the mainstream, and even high-fashion, appeal. The Punjabi suit is popular in other regions of the Indian subcontinent, such as Mumbai and Sindh. The popularity of Punjabi suits in India was extentuated during the 1960s through Hindi cinema. Punjabi suits are also popular among young women in Bangladesh and are especially popular amongst school girls in India. The outfit is also popular in Afghanistan, where it is called the Punjabi.

Another common type of Punjabi shalwar kameez is the Patiala salwar which has many folds and originates in the city of Patiala.

Another style of the Punjabi suit is the use of the shalwar which hails from the Pothohar region of Punjab, Pakistan and is known as the Pothohari shalwar. The Pothohari shalwar retains the wideness of the older Punjabi suthan and also has some folds. The kameez is also wide. The head scarf is traditionally large, similar to the chador or phulkari that was used throughout the plains of the Punjab region.

Saraiki shalwar suits are Punjabi outfits which include the Bahawalpuri shalwar suit and the Multani shalwar suit.

The Bahawalpuri shalwar originates from the Bahawalpur region of Punjab, Pakistan. The Bahawalpuri shalwar is very wide and baggy with many voluminous folds. The material traditionally used for the Bahawalpuri shalwar and suthan is known as Sufi which is a mixture of cotton warp mixed with silk weft and gold threads running down the material. The other name for these types of mixed cloth is shuja khani. The Bahawalpuri shalwar is worn with the Bahawalpur style kameez, the Punjabi kurta or chola.

The Multani shalwar, also known as the 'ghaire wali' or 'Saraiki ghaire wali' shalwar as it is very wide around the waist, originates from the Multan area of the Punjab region. The style is similar to the Sindhi kancha shalwar as both are derivatives of the pantaloon shalwar worn in Iraq and adopted in these locations during the 7th century A.D. The Multani shalwar is very wide, baggy, and full, and has folds like the Punjabi suthan. The upper garments include the Punjabi kameez and the chola of the Punjab region.

An older variety of shalwar kameez of the Punjab region is the Punjabi suthan and kurta suit. The Punjabi suthan is a local variation of the ancient svasthana tight fitting trousers which have been used in the Punjab region since the ancient period and were worn with the tunic called varbana which was tight fitting.

The Punjabi suthan is arranged in plaits and uses large amounts of material (traditionally coloured cotton with vertical silk lines, called sussi) of up to 20 yards hanging in many folds. The suthan ends at the ankles with a tight band which distinguishes the suthan from a shalwar. The modern equivalent of the loose Punjabi suthan are the cowl pants and dhoti shalwars which have many folds.

Some versions of the Punjabi suthan tighten from the knees down to the ankles (a remnant of the svasthana). If a tight band is not used, the ends of the suthan fit closely around the ankles. The Jodhpuri breeches devised during the 1870s by Sir Pratap Singh of Jodhpur offer a striking slim line resemblance to the centuries-old tight Punjabi suthan, although the churidar is cited as its source. The tight pantaloon style suthan was popular with the Indian Cavalry during the 19th and early 20th centurie; they were dyed in Multani mutti or mitti (clay/fuller's earth), which gave the garments a yellow colour.

The kurta is a remnant of the 11th-century female kurtaka which was a shirt extending to the middle of the body with side slits worn in parts of north India which has remained a traditional garment for women in Punjab, albeit longer than the kurtaka. The suthan was traditionally worn with a long kurta but can also be worn with a short kurti or frocks. Modern versions of the kurta can be knee length. The head scarf is also traditionally long but again, modern versions are shorter.

The outfit in Jammu is the Dogri kurta and suthan. When the tight part of the suthan, up to the knees, has multiple close fitting folds, the suthan is referred to as Dogri pants or suthan, in Jammu, and churidar suthan in the Punjab region and some parts of Himachal Pradesh.

Sindhi suits
The traditional Sindhi shalwar, also called kancha,  are wide pantaloons which are wide down the legs and are also wide at the ankles. The Sindhi shalwar is plaited at the waist. The kancha shalwar is traditionally worn with either the Sindhi cholo (blouse) by women, or a knee length robe which flares out, by men.

The other styles of shalwar kameez are female Sindhi suthan and cholo and male Sindhi suthan and angelo.

See also

 Central Asian clothing
 Chemise
 Chikankari
 Churidar
 Dhoti
 Dupatta
 Gagra choli
 Khet partug
 Kurta
 Pencil skirt
 Pencil suit
 Perahan tunban
 Kashmiri phiran and poots
 Qamis
 Sari
 Sherwani
 Sirwal
 Turkish salvar

Notes

Explanatory notes

Citations

General and cited references 
 
 
 .

External links

 Himal: "The Salwar Revolution"
 The Hindu: "The Spread of the Salwar"
 Fatima Jinnah wearing shalwar qameez

Afghan clothing
Bangladeshi clothing
Bangladeshi culture
Indian clothing
Indian culture
Pakistani clothing
Suits (clothing)
Tops (clothing)
Trousers and shorts